A penumbral lunar eclipse took place on 5 June 2020. It was the second of four penumbral lunar eclipses in 2020.

Visibility 
It was visible in most parts of Europe (except northern Scandinavia), Asia (except the northeast parts of the Russian Far East), Africa, Australia, eastern parts of South America and Antarctica.

Gallery

Related eclipses

Eclipses of 2020 
 A penumbral lunar eclipse on 10 January.
 A penumbral lunar eclipse on 5 June.
 An annular solar eclipse on 21 June.
 A penumbral lunar eclipse on 5 July.
 A penumbral lunar eclipse on 30 November.
 A total solar eclipse on 14 December.

Lunar year series

Saros series 
It is part of Saros cycle 111.

Half-Saros cycle
A lunar eclipse will be preceded and followed by solar eclipses by 9 years and 5.5 days (a half saros). This lunar eclipse is related to two partial solar eclipses of Solar Saros 118.

See also 
List of lunar eclipses and List of 21st-century lunar eclipses

References 

 Saros cycle 111

External links 

2020-06
2020 in science
June 2020 events